The 2012 Samford Bulldogs football team represented Samford University in the 2012 NCAA Division I FCS football season. They were led by sixth year head coach Pat Sullivan and played their home games at Seibert Stadium. They are a member of the Southern Conference. They finished the season 7–4, 5–3 in SoCon play to finish in a three way tie for fourth place.

Schedule

Ranking movements

References

Samford
Samford Bulldogs football seasons
Samford Bulldogs football